Koloonella minutissima is a species of sea snail, a marine gastropod mollusk in the family Murchisonellidae, the pyrams and their allies.

Distribution
This marine species occurs off Eastern Australia and New South Wales.

References
Citations

Sources
 Iredale, T. & McMichael, D.F. (1962). A reference list of the marine Mollusca of New South Wales. Memoirs of the Australian Museum. 11 : 1-109

External links
 To World Register of Marine Species

Murchisonellidae
Gastropods described in 1951